North Carolina's 34th Senate district is one of 50 districts in the North Carolina Senate. It has been represented by Republican Paul Newton since 2023.

Geography
Since 2023, the district has included part of Cabarrus County. The district overlaps with the 73rd, 82nd, and 83rd state house districts.

District officeholders

Election results

2022

2020

2018

2016

2014

2012

2010

2008

2006

2004

2002

2000

References

North Carolina Senate districts
Cabarrus County, North Carolina